The Malayan Peoples' Socialist Front (Malay: Fron Sosialis Rakyat Malaya) or better known as Socialist Front (SF) was a left-wing coalition of Malaysian socialist parties. It was among the longest-standing opposition coalitions in Malaysian general election history. The coalition was formed by Partai Rakyat (PRM) and the Labour Party of Malaya on Hari Merdeka in 1957. In 1964, National Convention Party (NCP) joined the coalition. PRM left the coalition in 1965 and NCP soon become inactive. The Labour Party, the only remaining party in SF, abandoned it on 10 January 1966 and reverted to its own banner.

History 
The coalition was formed on Hari Merdeka by two multi-racial parties - the Partai Rakyat (PRM) which had a Malay leftist leadership and the Labour Party of Malaya, which was largely supported by Malaya's Chinese minority. The first chairman was Ahmad Boestamam, the PRM president.

In the 1959 General Elections, the Socialist Front (SF) managed to gain 8 seats in Selangor, Johor, and Penang constituencies. It won 34.6% of the popular vote cast in the constituencies. SF as a whole successfully garnered 13% of the votes, thus becoming the third-largest party in Parliament after the Alliance and the Pan Malaysian Islamic Party (PMIP).

The Socialist Front managed to gain 13 out of 14 seats in George Town, Penang during the 1961 Local Elections. The SF was further strengthened when the former Minister of Agriculture, Aziz Ishak, brought his National Convention Party into the coalition. Ahmad Boestamam resigned as SF chairman in 1961 to concentrate on leading PRM.

In 1963, shortly after the events of the Indonesia-Malaysia confrontation, the government took action against several opposition politicians and activists. SF was seen as pro-Indonesia and pro-China, causing the Socialist Front leader's arrest. Among those detained and arrested were Ahmad Boestamam (PR president), Ishak Haji Muhammad (PBM president), Abdul Aziz Ishak (NCP president) and Datuk Kampo Radjo (later to become president of the PRM), Tan Kai Hee, Tan Hock Hin, Dr. M.K. Rajakumar, Hasnul Hadi, Tajuddin Kahar, Kamarulzaman Teh and hundreds of others. Rallies and mass demonstrations were held on 13 February 1965 in Kuala Lumpur in conjunction with the second anniversary of the detention of Ahmad Boestamam and others to oppose the mass arrests of activists and leaders of the SF under the Internal Security Act (ISA) and the alleged involvement in "subversive" activities.

In the 1964 General Elections, the Socialist Front lost 6 seats and managed to retain 2 seats. PR and the NCP failed to gain any seats at all and the PBM lost a significant number of seats. Cancellation of local government elections in 1965 after the declaration of Emergency in 1964 because of continued confrontation with Indonesia, weakened the impact of SF. Dispute between the two parties resulted in PR leaving the coalition in 1965, and NCP soon become inactive. PBM, the only party in SF that held seats, abandoned it on 10 January 1966 and reverted to its own banner.

Aftermath 
In 1968, most of PBM's members linked up with UDP members to form Gerakan.PBM boycott the 1969 elections and organised demonstrations against the detention of its leaders by the government.

After the elections, PBM continued in the face of tough action by the government and was finally wound up on 6 September 1972. PR changed its name to Parti Sosialis Rakyat Malaysia (PSRM) in 1970 and again in 1989 (Parti Rakyat Malaysia-PRM).

Ahmad Boestamam and Ishak Haji Muhammad established Parti Marhaen Malaysia (PMM) in 1968. PMM then merged with Parti Keadilan Masyarakat Malaysia (PEKEMAS) in 1974. He tried to resurrect the coalition before the 1974 elections, but failed.

Component parties 
 Partai Rakyat
 Parti Buruh Malaya
 National Convention Party

Elected representatives 
 Members of the Dewan Rakyat, 1st Malayan Parliament
 List of Malaysian State Assembly Representatives (1959–64)
 Members of the Dewan Rakyat, 2nd Malaysian Parliament
 List of Malaysian State Assembly Representatives (1964–69)

General elections result

State election results

References 

Socialist parties in Malaysia
Political parties established in 1957
Political parties disestablished in 1966
1957 establishments in Malaya
Defunct left-wing political party alliances
Defunct political party alliances in Malaysia